Good Girl is a 2005 French comedy film directed by Sophie Fillières.

Cast 
 Emmanuelle Devos - Fontaine Leglou
 Lambert Wilson - Philippe Philippe
 Bruno Todeschini - Michel Strogoff
 Michael Lonsdale - Jean
 Bulle Ogier - Angèle
 Julie-Anne Roth - Cléia
  - Jean-Jacques
 Michel Vuillermoz - Le docteur Gudarzi

References

External links 

2000s sex comedy films
French sex comedy films
2000s French-language films
2005 films
2000s French films